Quissamã is a municipality located in the Brazilian state of Rio de Janeiro.  It sits on Atlantic coastline with the two largest neighboring cities being Campos das Goytacazes to the north and Macaé to the south.  Quissamã was part of the municipality of Macaé until the city emancipated in 1989. The population has surpassed 20,000 inhabitants as of the 2010 Census. The city's primary source of tax revenue comes from oil royalties collected from drilling in the waters just off its coast.

References

Populated coastal places in Rio de Janeiro (state)
Municipalities in Rio de Janeiro (state)